A Rookie of the Year award is given by a number of sports leagues to the top-performing athlete in his or her first season within the league. Athletes competing for the first time in any given league are also known as "rookies".

Principal leagues
The honor is awarded annually to the top rookie performers in:
Canadian Football League
Indianapolis 500
IndyCar
Major League Baseball
Major League Lacrosse
Major League Soccer
NASCAR
National Basketball Association
National Football League
National Hockey League
Women's Professional Soccer

Award outside North America
Some rookie of the year awards exist outside North America, one example being the Elitserien Rookie of the Year in Swedish ice hockey.

The North American sports development system delays athletes' entry into the top level of professional sports until the best of them are ready to make a major impact in their first season. The typical development path varies by sport:
 American football – Essentially all future professionals spend anywhere from three to five years in college programs, playing for a maximum of four years, before becoming eligible for professional play.
 Canadian football – Similar to American football, with players drawn from both Canadian university programs and U.S. college football.
 Basketball – Almost all American players now spend at least one year in college basketball because of recent changes in NBA rules. Although the NBA has its own minor league, virtually all players in that league come from the college ranks as well.
 Baseball – While college baseball plays a role in player development, it is significantly less than that of the extensive, and fully professional (bordering on semi-professional at the lowest level), minor league baseball system. Almost all players, whether or not they play college baseball, will spend several years in the minors before making a major-league team.
 Hockey – In Canada, a large majority of future NHL players develop as juniors in the professional Canadian Hockey League. While some American players opt for the CHL (which has some American teams), most choose college hockey. In either case, only the very top prospects will graduate immediately from the CHL or NCAA to the NHL; most will spend some time in an NHL team's minor-league system.

However, in other parts of the world, it is usual for clubs to train their own players and introduce them into the first team gradually. Occasionally, young players who show extraordinary talent are introduced to the first team during their teens, with notable examples being Wayne Rooney in association football and Ricky Rubio in basketball.

To reflect this difference Young player of the year awards with an upper age limit usually somewhere in the early 20s, are more common elsewhere,  e.g. soccer's FIFPro World Young Player of the Year.

However golf's PGA European Tour has the Sir Henry Cotton Rookie of the Year award, and Grand Prix motorcycle racing also awards the top rookie of each class.

Sports Rookie of the Year awards

Association football
 PFA Young Player of the Year
 Premier League Young Player of the Season
 Serie A Young Footballer of the Year
 Ligue 1 Young player of the year
 MLS Young Player of the Year Award
 K League Young Player of the Year Award
 J.League Best Young Player
 A-League Men Young Footballer of the Year
 A-League Women Young Footballer of the Year
 WPS Rookie of the Year Award
 NWSL Rookie of the Year
 Golden Boy

Auto racing
Indianapolis 500
IndyCar
NASCAR
Grand Prix motorcycle racing

Baseball
Major League Baseball (in each league)
Esurance MLB Awards Best Rookie (in MLB)
Players Choice Awards Outstanding Rookie (in each league)
Baseball America
Baseball Prospectus Internet Baseball Awards
Sporting News (from 1963 through 2003, there were two categories: Rookie Pitcher of the Year and Rookie Player of the Year)
Baseball America All-Rookie Team
Topps All-Star Rookie Team
MLB Rookie of the Month Award
Chinese Professional Baseball League (Chinese Taipei: Republic of China)
Japan Professional Baseball
Korea Baseball Organization

Basketball
National Basketball Association
NBA Development League Rookie of the Year Award
WNBA Rookie of the Year Award
NBL (Australia) Rookie of the Year
Philippine Basketball Association Rookie of the Year award

Football (American)
National Football League

Football (Canadian)
Canadian Football League

Golf
Ladies European Tour
LPGA Tour
PGA Tour
PGA European Tour

Hockey
Canadian Hockey League
Central Hockey League
International Hockey League
National Hockey League
Quebec Major Junior Hockey League

Lacrosse
Major League Lacrosse

Rugby league
National Rugby League
NRL Women's Premiership

See also
 Most Valuable Player

References